Maryse Rouy (born November 4, 1951) is a French-born writer living in Quebec. She has written novels for both adults and young audiences.

She was born in Saint-Laurent-sur-Save and came to Quebec in 1975. She earned a bachelor's degree in teaching and began teaching in primary school. She went on to study at the Université de Montréal, earning a master's degree on the poetry of troubadours.

Selected works 
 Azalaïs - ou, La vie courtoise, novel (1995)
 Jordan et la forteresse assiégée, youth novel (2001)
 Au nom de Compostelle, novel (2003), received the 
 Un Avion dans la nuit, youth novel (2010), received the 
 Les pavés de Carcassonne, novel (2012)
 Meurtre à l'hôtel Despréaux, novel (2014), finalist for an Arthur Ellis Award

References 

1951 births
Living people
Canadian novelists in French
Canadian women novelists
Canadian writers of young adult literature